Farmen 2020 (The Farm 2020) is the thirthteenth season of the Swedish version of The Farm reality television show. 19 contestants arrived on the farm where they have to complete tasks in order to help win equipment and food. Each week, two contestants are chosen to duel where the winner remains and the loser has to leave the farm. The show premiered on 5 January 2020 on TV4.

Format
Contestants from all across Sweden are chosen to live on a farm like it was 100 years ago. Every week, one contestant is designated to be the head of the farm. They must choose someone to take part in a duel. The person chosen for the duel then selects someone of the same gender to compete against them in the duel where the loser is kicked out of the farm. Starting in week two, the contestant who was evicted from the farm decides who the new head of the farm shall be.

Finishing order
(age are stated at time of competition)

The game

References

External links

The Farm (franchise)
2020 Swedish television seasons